Farmers' Union or Farmers Union may refer to

Farmers Union (brand), food brand
Farmers Union Iced Coffee, flavoured milk drink
Farmers' Union of Canada, farmers organization in Canada
Farmers' Union of Wales, member organisation
Indian Farmers' Union, Indian farmers' representative organization
Latvian Farmers' Union, political party in Latvia
New Farmers' Union, political party in Latvia in the inter-war period
New Zealand Farmers Union, now known as Federated Farmers
Queensland Farmers' Union, political party of Australia
Southern Tenant Farmers Union, civil farmer's union in the Southern United States
Ulster Farmers' Union, member organisation for farmers in Northern Ireland
Victorian Farmers' Union, association of farmers in the Australian state of Victoria

See also
National Farmers Union (disambiguation)